On 13 October 2013, riots in Biryulyovo Zapadnoye, a district in southern Moscow, erupted. The riots were in response to news that Egor Shcherbakov, a 25-year-old man who was killed on 10 October, had allegedly been attacked by a migrant who "might have come from Central Asia or the Caucasus". The footage of Shcherbakov being stabbed was circulated by news agencies.

The police announced a reward of 1 million rubles (~$30,975) for any information about the suspect.

On 14 October, the police arrested more than 1,200 migrant workers where the killer allegedly lived.

On 15 October, Orkhan Zeynalov, an Azerbaijani citizen, was arrested in Kolomna as a suspect in the killing of Shcherbakov.

See also
Murder of Egor Sviridov (2010), another murder case that sparked riots in Moscow

References 

Race riots
2013 riots
Biryulyovo riots
Riots and civil disorder in Russia
2013 in Moscow
October 2013 events in Russia